The Bras du Nord is a tributary of the Valin River, flowing in the unorganized territory of Mont-Valin and in the municipality of Saint-David-de-Falardeau, in the Le Fjord-du-Saguenay Regional County Municipality, in the administrative region of Saguenay–Lac-Saint-Jean, in Quebec, in Canada. The course of the Bras du Nord flows in the canton of Falardeau.

A secondary forest road serves the southwest bank of the Bras du Nord valley and the lakes upstream; other secondary forest roads have been developed in the sector for the needs of forestry and recreational tourism activities.

The surface of the North Arm is usually frozen from the end of November to the beginning of April, however the safe circulation on the ice is generally done from mid-December to the end of March.

Geography 
The main neighboring watersheds of the Bras du Nord are:
 North side: Nisipi River, Saint-Louis River, rivière à la Hache;
 East side: Saint-Louis River, Valin river, Bras des Canots;
 South side: Caribou River, Saguenay River, Michaud River (Saguenay River), Shipshaw River;
 West side: Lac La Mothe, rivière à l'Ours, Blanche River, Shipshaw River.

The North Arm takes its source at the mouth of a mountain stream.

From its source, the course of the Bras du Nord descends on  according to the following segments:
  south-east, up to the Bérubé stream (coming from the north-west);
  towards the South-East, up to the Romeo stream (coming from the North-East);
  towards the Southeast, up to the stream bras de Fer (coming from the East);
  towards the South-West, by forming a curve by skirting a mountain to redirect towards the South-East, until the discharge (coming from the West) of a set of lakes;
  south-east, to the mouth of the river.

The mouth of the Bras du Nord spills onto the west bank of the Valin River at the foot of the Chute à Banc d'oeuvre. This mouth is located at:

  North-West of the mouth of the Valin River (confluence with the Saguenay River);
  north of downtown Saguenay;
  West of the mouth of the Saguenay River.

From the mouth of the Bras du Nord, the current follows the course of the Valin River, then the course of the Saguenay river up to Tadoussac where it merges with the St. Lawrence river.

Toponymy 
Formerly, this watercourse was designated "Rivière Falardeau", which was associated with the township of Falardeau, in Saguenay-Lac-Saint-Jean. The name of this old toponym evokes the career of the painter Antoine-Sébastien Falardeau (Cap-Santé, August 13, 1822 - Florence, Italy, July 14, 1889); Falardeau had a career mainly in Italy, his second homeland. Falardeau was above all dedicated to making excellent copies of great masters of painting. His training as a painter is little known; he took painting lessons and was apprenticed as a sign painter with Robert Clow Todd in 1841 in Quebec.

It is possible that the Italian painter G. Fassio, who had been staying in this city since 1835, oriented him towards Italy and taught him the basics of Italian. In 1846 Falardeau left Quebec for Florence. After difficult years, his reputation was established: Charles III, Duke of Parma, appointed him knight of the order of Saint Louis, January 17, 1852. He married Caterina Manucci-Benincasa, daughter of the Marquis Francesco Mannucci-Benincasa Capponi, in 1861, with whom he had at least three children.

In 1862 and 1882, he returned to Canada briefly and exhibited his paintings there. The Canadian government commissioned him in 1882 to paint a portrait of Joseph-Adolphe Chapleau, a former premier of the province of Quebec. He accidentally dies in Florence, his horse, wrapped up, having thrown him into the river. The dispersion of his paintings made it impossible to study in depth his work. The Musée du Québec, however, has twenty.

The toponym "Bras du Nord" was formalized on April 8, 1975, at the Place Names Bank of the Commission de toponymie du Québec, that is to say at the creation of this commission.

Notes and references

See also 
 Le Fjord-du-Saguenay Regional County Municipality
 Mont-Valin, an unorganized territory
 Saint-David-de-Falardeau, a municipality
 Bras de Fer (bras du Nord), a stream
 Valin River, a watercourse
 Saguenay River
 St. Lawrence river
 List of rivers of Quebec

Rivers of Saguenay–Lac-Saint-Jean
Le Fjord-du-Saguenay Regional County Municipality